Federica Ferraro (born 18 August 1988) is an Italian racewalker, four-time national champion at senior level.

National titles
Italian Athletics Championships
20 km race walk: 2011, 2012, 2013
10,000 m race walk (track): 2011

See also
 Italian team at the running events
 Italy at the European Race Walking Cup

References

External links

1988 births
Living people
Italian female racewalkers
Athletics competitors of Centro Sportivo Aeronautica Militare